Born Free is an album by vibraphonist Milt Jackson recorded in 1966 and released on the Limelight label.

Reception
The Allmusic review by Ken Dryden awarded the album 4 stars stating "This obscure mid-'60s record by Milt Jackson has few surprises, though many jazz fans would be suspicious that the theme from the movie Born Free would turn into a viable jazz vehicle. Jackson's funky treatment of this normally laid-back piece works very well".

Track listing
All compositions by Milt Jackson except as indicated
 "Born Free" (John Barry, Don Black) - 4:05 
 "Bring It Home (To Me)" (Jimmy Heath) - 3:19 
 "Tears of Joy" (Luchi DeJesus, Paul Francis Webster) - 3:31 
 "Whalepool" - 2:25 
 "Some Kinda Waltz" - 3:07 
 "A Time and a Place" (Heath) - 2:37 
 "We Dwell in Our Hearts" (Jack Wohl, Jim Haines, Mitch Leigh) - 3:00 
 "So What" (Miles Davis) - 5:17 
 "The Shadow of Your Smile" (Johnny Mandel, Webster) - 3:59 
 "One Step Down" (Cedar Walton) - 2:48
Recorded in New York City on December 15, 1966

Personnel
Milt Jackson – vibes
Jimmy Owens - trumpet
Jimmy Heath - tenor saxophone
Cedar Walton - piano
Walter Booker - bass
Mickey Roker, Otis "Candy" Finch - drums

References 

Limelight Records albums
Milt Jackson albums
1968 albums